David or Dave Griffiths may refer to:

Sportsmen 
David Griffiths (sport shooter) (1874–1931), British Olympic sports shooter
David Griffiths (golfer) (born 1980), English professional golfer
David Griffiths (cricketer) (born 1985), English cricketer
Dave Griffiths (Australian footballer) (1895–1953), Australian rules footballer
Dave Griffiths (association footballer), footballer for Tranmere Rovers
Dave Griffiths (boxer) (1963-2007), British Olympic boxer

Others 
David Griffiths (archdeacon of Berkshire) (1927–2012), Anglican priest
David Griffiths (botanist) (1867–1935), American botanist
David Griffiths (composer) (born 1950), New Zealand composer, baritone and convener
David Griffiths (missionary) (1792–1863), British Christian missionary and translator in Madagascar
David Griffiths (politician) (1896–1977), British politician, member of Parliament for Rother Valley
David Griffiths (co-operative economist), Australian economist 
David J. Griffiths (born 1942), American physicist
David Griffiths (portrait painter) (born 1939), Welsh artist
David Rees Griffiths (1882–1953), Welsh poet
Dave Griffiths (musician) (born 1983), English Christian musician and guitarist

See also
David Griffith (disambiguation)